was a town located in Higashiiwai District, Iwate Prefecture, Japan that is now part of the city of Ichinoseki, Iwate. As of June 2005, the town had an estimated population of 8,950 and a population density of 72.76 persons per km2. The total area was 123.15 km2.

The Fujisawa village was created on April 1, 1889 within Higashiiwai District with the establishment of the municipality system. It was raised to town status on June 1, 1926. On August 20, 1954 it annexed the neighboring villages of  Kinomi, Yasawa and a portion of Otsubo village.

On September 26, 2011, Fujisawa was merged into the expanded city of Ichinoseki  municipality, Higashiiwai District.

It had connections to Blackwater and Emerald in the Central Highlands in Queensland, a coal and blossoming farming region in Australia. Fujisawa has most wonderful annual Festival, entitled the Noyaki Matsuri, which is held in August each year. During this time students from all the schools exhibit team work in a practical manner wherein they create a pottery design to be fired in the open pits, as part of a community competition. The festival highlights the town's creativity and openness to welcome potters and sculptors from around Japan and internationally, and people enjoy food stalls, taiko drumming, ceremonial dancing, upon the Junior High School sports fields in Fujisawa. It is known for a town of International Friendship for over 30 years with Australia and also with Vietnam.

Several outstanding businesses thrive in the Fujisawa environs, such as the Shoei Motorcycle Helmut Factory. There is an annual motocross racing event which once more draws crowds of people to this most picturesque Japanese township, located 30 minutes from the eastern coast of Japan.

External links

Official website  (English version)

Dissolved municipalities of Iwate Prefecture
Ichinoseki, Iwate